COF may refer to:

 Canadian Orienteering Federation, governing body of orienteering in Canada
 Capital One Financial (NYSE: COF), a United States bank
Certificate of Fitness (automotive), may appear on invoice after repair or servicing indicating vehicle is "road ready"
 Circle of fifths, a concept in music theory
 Coefficient of friction, the ratio of the force of friction between two bodies and the force pressing them together
 Cofactor (linear algebra), in linear algebra, cof(A) refers to the sum of the matrix A's
 Coffin Store, a Finnish subsidiary of Crystal's
 Congreso Obrero de Filipinas, in the Philippines
 Covalent organic framework, two-dimensional and three-dimensional organic solids with extended structures
 Cradle Of Filth, an English extreme metal band
 Patrick Space Force Base (IATA: COF), a United States Space Force Base in Florida
 COF, Chip on Flex